Anthony Nicholl (also Nicoll or Nicolls; November 1611 - February 1658) was an English politician, friend and associate of Parliamentary leaders John Pym and John Hampden.

In the political struggles that followed victory in the 1642 to 1646 First English Civil War, he was one of the Eleven Members accused by senior Army officers in July 1647 of attempting to destabilise the kingdom. 

Suspended in January 1648, he was restored, then expelled in Pride's Purge of December 1648. He returned to Parliament in 1654, and was appointed Sheriff of Cornwall in 1656. He died in London in February 1658.

Biography
Anthony Nicholl was born 14 November 1611, one of many children born to Humphrey Nicholl (1577–1643), and Philippa Rouse (died 1669). His father was a member of the Cornish gentry, his mother half-sister to John Pym. The family  descended from Oto Nicoll, an immigrant from Guernsey, who sat for Lostwithiel in 1437 and acquired Penvose in 1446.

He married Amey Speckett (1609–1685), whose family came from Thornbury, Devon; they had nine children, five sons and four daughters. After his death, she married another member of the local gentry, John Vivian.

Career

His father was a close associate of William Coryton, leader of Cornish opposition to the 1627 Forced Loan; a key stage in the struggle between Charles I and Parliament, this led to the institution of Personal Rule in 1629. Both he and Anthony supported the Presbyterian faction in the House of Commons, led by their relative, John Pym. 

In April 1640, Nicholl was elected MP for Bossiney, which was dissolved by Charles in May. Following new elections in November 1640, he became MP for Bodmin, in the 1640 to 1660 Long Parliament.

John Pym nominated him as a Parliamentary observer at the trial of Strafford in March 1641. When the First English Civil War began in August 1642, unlike many of the Cornish gentry, the Nicholls backed Parliament. In September 1642, Francis Bassett, the Royalist Sheriff of Cornwall, expelled them and other supporters from the county. 

In February 1643, Parliamentarians in Cornwall and Devon agreed a local truce with their Royalist opponents, causing outrage in London. Nicholl was sent to Exeter to warn his colleagues this was unacceptable, and no further agreements should be made. In May, he was present at the Battle of Stratton, a Royalist victory that ensured their control of the West Country. Nicholl's estates were occupied until the end of the war, and in June 1645, he received financial support from Parliament. 

His close friend John Hampden died of wounds received at Chalgrove Field in June. Nicholl wrote; "Never Kingdom received a greater loss in one subject, never a man a truer and more faithful friend." His uncle John Pym died in December, while Stamford, Parliamentary commander at Stratton, filed charges against Nicholl, claiming  blamed for his defeat. However, Nicholl successfully refuted these, and they were dismissed in May 1644.   

In the political struggle that followed the end of the war in June 1646, he was a leader of the Parliamentary opposition to Oliver Cromwell. In July 1647, he was one of the Eleven Members impeached by senior Army officers of attempting to destabilise the kingdom. The Eleven withdrew from Parliament; unlike some of his colleagues, Nicholl received a pass to Cornwall, rather than abroad. 

Arrested on 17 August on his way home, he was taken to New Model Army headquarters in Kingston upon Thames, but quietly allowed to escape a few days later. Parliamentary proceedings to impeach the Eleven Members were suspended when the Second English Civil War began in February, then abandoned in June. As a gesture of reconciliation, Nicholl was given the sinecure of Master of the Armoury.  

Defeat in the Second English Civil War broke the power of the Presbyterian opposition, and Nicholl was among those expelled by Pride's Purge in 1648. He later reconciled with the new regime; in 1654, he was returned as one of the MPs for Cornwall, then re-elected in 1656. During the Rule of the Major-Generals from 1655 to 1657, he was one of 12 advisors for the South-West. He was appointed High Sheriff of Cornwall in 1657, and provided regular updates to John Thurloe, head of intelligence under the Protectorate.

In February 1658, Nicholl died in London, and buried in the graveyard attached to the Savoy Chapel. In 1681, his wife erected a family memorial in St Uda, parish church of St Tudy in Cornwall; in addition to her husband and herself, it includes four sons who died between 1649 and 1678.

References

Sources

External links
 
 

 

1611 births
1658 deaths
Members of the pre-1707 English Parliament for constituencies in Cornwall
High Sheriffs of Cornwall
Roundheads
Eleven Members
English MPs 1640 (April)
English Presbyterians of the Interregnum (England)
English MPs 1640–1648
English MPs 1654–1655